Sengipatti is a village in Budalur taluk on the Tanjore–Trichy National Highway of Tanjore district, Tamil Nadu. It is located 23 kilometers from Thanjavur 33 kilometers from Tiruchirapalli  46 kilometers from Pudukkottai 65 kilometers from Ariyalur and 66 kilometers from kumbakonam. It is the main junction of bus routes for Thanjavur, Trichy and Pudukottai districts.

The Mahatma Gandhi Memorial Tuberculosis Sanatorium is a landmark. The village is the most westerly village located in Thanjavur district and is situated on the frontier with Tiruchirapalli district.  SASTRA University is located just 7km from Sengipatti while National Institute of Technology Trichy is located 17km away. It is one of the developing villages and has more industries addition to that the state government has set up Government College of Engineering, Thanjavur in 2012. 

The proposed All India Institutes of Medical Sciences for Tamil Nnadu was likely to be built here. But it is constructed in Madurai district. Sanoorapatti is a prime spot located on national highway of Trichy and Thanjavur, Sengipatti is located 1 km from Sanoorapatti and National Highway.

Importance
Sengipatti has risen in importance due to the emergence of The Mahatma Gandhi Memorial Tuberculosis Sanatorium.

Education
Government College of Engineering and RVS Agricultural College are the two important educational institutes present in Sengipatti.

Demographics 

As per the 2011 census, Sengipatti had a population of 4271 with 2115 males and 2156 females. The sex ratio was 1019 which is higher than Tamil Nadu state average of 996 and the literacy rate was 78.99% as compared to 80.09% of Tamil Nadu.

References 

Villages in Thanjavur district